Pio Island is an island in the Solomon Islands province of Makira-Ulawa. It is situated 4 km north-west of Ugi Island. It is 2.7 km long and 1.5 km wide. The estimated terrain elevation above sea level is some 227 metres. The island has no villages. Coral reef surrounds the island, which is largest in the west and south of the island.

See also
Oceania
Pacific Islands
Pacific Ocean

References

Islands of the Solomon Islands